is a Japanese former road racer of motorcycles at Grand Prix level. He began his Grand Prix career in 1993. In 1996, he won All Japan Championship Superbike class champion. He returned to Grand Prix racing with Honda in 1997, enjoying his best season when he finished fifth in the 500cc world championship. A spinal injury in a 1998 motorcycle crash left him paralyzed below the waist. Aoki has continued to work with Honda, helping them develop cars for disabled people. He is the brother of Grand Prix racers, Nobuatsu and Haruchika Aoki.

Aoki has been involved in motorsports again. Using specially-modified 4-wheel drive vehicles, he has been involved in many cross country rallies, notably the Dakar Rally, the Jaguar I-Pace eTrophy and the Asia Cross Country Rally.

On July 10 2019, he took a test ride on the Team Honda Dream CBR1000 Suzuka 8 Hours machine. In 2021, Aoki competed in the Le Mans 24 hour race as part of Frederick Sausset's SRT41 team.

Career statistics

Grand Prix motorcycle racing

Races by year
(key) (Races in bold indicate pole position, races in italics indicate fastest lap)

Superbike World Championship

Races by year

Complete Jaguar I-Pace eTrophy results
(key) (Races in bold indicate pole position)

Complete 24 Hours of Le Mans results

References 

1974 births
Living people
Japanese motorcycle racers
Japanese people with disabilities
250cc World Championship riders
500cc World Championship riders
Superbike World Championship riders
Japanese rally drivers
People with paraplegia
Sportspeople from Tokyo
24 Hours of Le Mans drivers
Le Mans Cup drivers
Japanese racing drivers